DriveBC is a website and toll-free phone service which provides traffic, road, and weather conditions for British Columbia, Canada’s provincial highways. The service, delivered by the provincial government’s Ministry of Transportation, helps motorists decide when to travel and which route to take.

Features
The DriveBC website displays current road conditions, such as slippery sections and poor visibility; incidents, such as collisions and rock slides; and future planned events, such as avalanche prevention, construction, and bridge maintenance.

In addition, the DriveBC map features highway webcam icons, which when clicked on, display recently captured images of highway conditions throughout the province.

DriveBC also offers current and forecast weather data. This data is collected from weather stations operated either by the BC Ministry of Transportation or Environment Canada.

A distance calculator, BC Ferries current conditions, inland ferry information, TransLink (South Coast British Columbia Transportation Authority), seasonal load restrictions for commercial vehicles, and Canada/United States border wait times are all linked from the DriveBC website.

Data collection
DriveBC road condition and incident information is submitted by government and road maintenance contractor staff, who are responsible for maintaining the provincial highway network. The information is regularly updated, based on the conditions that contracted staff encounter while performing highway maintenance.

Advanced Traveller Information System
The DriveBC technology is referred to as an Advanced Traveller Information System, or ATIS.
The purpose of ATIS is to collect and disseminate (broadcast) timely road condition and incident information in order to help motorists decide when to travel and the route to take.

History
DriveBC was launched in July 2005, replacing its predecessor, BC Road Reports.

External links
 
 BC WeatherCams: contains all DriveBC webcams, AirportCams, SkiCams and more..

References

Transport in British Columbia